In materials science, dispersion is the fraction of atoms of a material exposed to the surface.  In general:

D = NS/NT

where D is the dispersion, NS is the number of surface atoms and NT is the total number of atoms of the material.  Dispersion is an important concept in heterogeneous catalysis, since only atoms that are exposed to the surface are able to play a role in catalytic surface reactions. Dispersion increases with decreasing crystallite size and approaches unity at a crystallite diameter of about 0.1 nm.

Related article
Emulsion dispersion

References

Materials science